Gregory Biekert (born March 14, 1969) is an American football coach and former linebacker in the National Football League (NFL).

Biekert attended Longs Peak Middle School and Longmont High School in Longmont, Colorado, where he lettered in football. He was a standout linebacker for the Colorado Buffaloes. After college, he was drafted by the then L.A. Raiders in the seventh round of the 1993 NFL Draft and played in 144 games with 123 starts. He led the Raiders in tackles for six seasons, including four straight years (1998–2001). He recovered the Tom Brady incomplete pass that was called because of the disputed and since overturned Tuck rule in the 2001 AFC divisional playoff game against the New England Patriots which Tom Brady admitted might have been a fumble in May of 2022. After two full seasons with the Minnesota Vikings, Biekert retired after the 2003 season.

Biekert rejoined the Raiders as an assistant coach on defense on July 27, 2010. He was promoted to linebackers coach on February 8, 2011. He resigned to focus on family following the 2011 season. He is currently coaching at Timnath Middle High School in Timnath, Colorado.

References

External links

Oakland Raiders bio

1969 births
American football linebackers
Colorado Buffaloes football players
Living people
Los Angeles Raiders players
Oakland Raiders players
Minnesota Vikings players
Oakland Raiders coaches